The pupil is the variable-sized, black opening in the centre of the iris.

Pupil may also refer to:

Student
Pupillage, a trainee barrister (England and Wales)
Entrance pupil, the optical image of the aperture stop, as 'seen' through the front of a lens system
Exit pupil, the image of the aperture stop in the optics that follow it
Pupil (band), a Filipino rock band
The Pupil (short story), 1891 short story by Henry James
The Pupil (TV series), 2010 Singaporean drama series